was a special temporary unit formed by KAT-TUN member Kazuya Kamenashi and NEWS member Tomohisa Yamashita for their 2005 drama Nobuta o Produce.  and  are the names of the characters Kamenashi and Yamashita play in the drama respectively. Although the drama has long finished on television, the duo have revived their performance of their song  numerous times. In 2017, they formed another special temporary unit, for their 2017 drama Boku, Unmei no Hito desu.

"Seishun Amigo"

Single information
The limited edition consists of three songs and a special 12-page photo booklet, and the regular edition consists three songs and their instrumentals. "Seishun Amigo" was used as the theme song for the drama Nobuta wo Produce starring Kamenashi, Yamashita and Maki Horikita. Musically, the song has a resemblance to Japanese kayōkyoku music of the 1980s.

Track list

Chart information
The unit's sole single "Seishun Amigo" was released on November 2, 2005 and debuted at number one on the Oricon singles weekly chart, selling 520,419 copies. It maintained its number one spot the following week, selling another 250,108 copies. The single sold more than a million copies in less than four weeks and spent a total of sixty-five weeks on the Oricon charts. The single was the best-selling single of 2005 and the third best-selling single of 2006.

In 2010, Seishun Amigo was reported by the Oricon's magazine, OriStar, for having sold over 1,627,000 copies and was later certified Million by RIAJ denoting over 1,000,000 shipments.

Charts and certifications

Charts

Sales and certifications

Performances
2005.10.23 Utawara Hot Hit 10
2005.10.27 Utaban
2005.10.28 Music Station
2005.10.31 Hey! Hey! Hey! Music Champ
2005.11.04 Music Fighter
2005.11.04 Music Station
2005.11.11 Music Station
2005.11.20 Utawara Hot Top 10
2005.11.30 
2005.12.23 Music Station Super Live 2005
2005.12.31 Johnny's Countdown Live
2006.03.18 
2006.08.26 
2007.12.31 Johnny's Countdown Live
2008.12.31 Johnny's Countdown Live
2009.08.31 24-Hour Television
2009.12.15 Best Artist
2009.12.31 Johnny's Countdown Live
2015.12.31 Johnny's Countdown Live
2017.07.01 The Music Day
2017.12.06 2017 FNS Music Festival

"Senaka goshi no Chance"

Single information
Limited edition 1 consists of one song and its music video and making-of and a special 8-panel lyrics card, limited edition 2 consists of four songs and three instrumentals and a 24-page lyrics booklet, and the regular edition consists of three songs and their instrumentals. "Senaka goshi no Chance" was used as the theme song for the drama Boku, Unmei no Hito desu starring Kamenashi, Yamashita, and Fumino Kimura.

Track list

Chart information
The single debuted at number one on the Oricon singles weekly chart, selling 175,269 copies. The single spent a total of twenty-three weeks on the Oricon charts. "Senaka goshi no Chance" debuted at number sixty on the Billboard Japan Hot 100 chart on May 8, 2017. It rose to number forty-one on May 22 and peaked at number one the following week. The song charted for eleven weeks on the Hot 100 chart. The single also topped the Billboard Japan top singles sales chart, selling 188,231 copies in its first week.

The single was certified Gold by RIAJ in May 2017.

Charts and certifications

Charts
{|class="wikitable sortable"
!Chart (2017)
!Peakposition
|-
|Japan Oricon Weekly Singles Chart 
|align="center"|1
|- 
|Japan Billboard Hot 100 Chart 
|align="center"|1 
|- 
|Japan Billboard Top Single Sales Chart  
|align="center"|1 
|-
|}

Sales and certifications
 

Performances 
2017.05.13 Count Down TV 
2017.05.16 Utacon 
2017.05.19 Music Station 
2017.05.19 Buzz Rhythm 
2017.05.26 Music Station 
2017.07.01 The Music Day 
2017.11.28 Best Artist 20172017.12.06 2017 FNS Music Festival''

References

External links 
 "Seishun Amigo" product information 
 "Senaka goshi no Chance" product information 

Japanese idol groups
Japanese pop music groups
Japanese boy bands
Johnny & Associates